HD 46815 (HR 2411) is a solitary star in the southern constellation Columba. It is faintly visible to the naked eye with an apparent magnitude of 5.4 and is estimated to be 408 light years away.

HD 46815 has a stellar classification of K3 III, indicating that it is a red giant. At present it has 117% the mass of the Sun but has expanded to 24.15 times its girth. HD 46815 has a metallicity 120% that of the Sun and is believed to be a member of the old disk.

References

Columba (constellation)
K-type giants
Columbae, 106
CD-36 2990
046815
031299
2411
High-proper-motion stars